The 1968 VFL season was the 72nd season of the Victorian Football League (VFL), the highest level senior Australian rules football competition in Victoria. The season featured twelve clubs, ran from 15 April until 28 September, and comprised a 20-game home-and-away season followed by a finals series featuring the top four clubs.

The premiership was won by the Carlton Football Club for the ninth time, after it defeated  by three points in the 1968 VFL Grand Final.

Premiership season
In 1968, the VFL competition consisted of twelve teams of 18 on-the-field players each, plus two substitute players, known as the 19th man and the 20th man. A player could be substituted for any reason; however, once substituted, a player could not return to the field of play under any circumstances.

Teams played each other in a home-and-away season of 20 rounds; matches 12 to 20 were the "home-and-way reverse" of matches 1 to 9.

Once the 20 round home-and-away season had finished, the 1968 VFL Premiers were determined by the specific format and conventions of the Page–McIntyre system.

Round 1

|- bgcolor="#CCCCFF"
| Home team
| Home team score
| Away team
| Away team score
| Venue
| Crowd
| Date
|- bgcolor="#FFFFFF"
| 
| 9.18 (72)
| 
| 13.10 (88)
| Western Oval
| 18,269
| 15 April 1968
|- bgcolor="#FFFFFF"
| 
| 26.16 (172)
| 
| 15.9 (99)
| Windy Hill
| 17,000
| 15 April 1968
|- bgcolor="#FFFFFF"
| 
| 10.12 (72)
| 
| 11.22 (88)
| Victoria Park
| 37,018
| 15 April 1968
|- bgcolor="#FFFFFF"
| 
| 13.22 (100)
| 
| 7.12 (54)
| Princes Park
| 30,158
| 15 April 1968
|- bgcolor="#FFFFFF"
| 
| 18.17 (125)
| 
| 13.22 (100)
| Lake Oval
| 23,675
| 15 April 1968
|- bgcolor="#FFFFFF"
| 
| 14.10 (94)
| 
| 12.18 (90)
| MCG
| 24,991
| 15 April 1968

Round 2

|- bgcolor="#CCCCFF"
| Home team
| Home team score
| Away team
| Away team score
| Venue
| Crowd
| Date
|- bgcolor="#FFFFFF"
| 
| 17.24 (126)
| 
| 19.12 (126)
| Glenferrie Oval
| 13,536
| 20 April 1968
|- bgcolor="#FFFFFF"
| 
| 16.22 (118)
| 
| 9.8 (62)
| Moorabbin Oval
| 21,758
| 20 April 1968
|- bgcolor="#FFFFFF"
| 
| 9.17 (71)
| 
| 6.11 (47)
| Kardinia Park
| 14,589
| 20 April 1968
|- bgcolor="#FFFFFF"
| 
| 9.9 (63)
| 
| 10.22 (82)
| Arden Street Oval
| 14,810
| 20 April 1968
|- bgcolor="#FFFFFF"
| 
| 14.16 (100)
| 
| 10.11 (71)
| Princes Park
| 17,149
| 20 April 1968
|- bgcolor="#FFFFFF"
| 
| 17.16 (118)
| 
| 10.12 (72)
| MCG
| 51,889
| 20 April 1968

Round 3

|- bgcolor="#CCCCFF"
| Home team
| Home team score
| Away team
| Away team score
| Venue
| Crowd
| Date
|- bgcolor="#FFFFFF"
| 
| 1.11 (17)
| 
| 7.8 (50)
| Princes Park
| 37,406
| 25 April 1968
|- bgcolor="#FFFFFF"
| 
| 10.15 (75)
| 
| 17.21 (123)
| MCG
| 52,175
| 25 April 1968
|- bgcolor="#FFFFFF"
| 
| 14.10 (94)
| 
| 16.9 (105)
| Western Oval
| 14,054
| 27 April 1968
|- bgcolor="#FFFFFF"
| 
| 2.19 (31)
| 
| 10.7 (67)
| Victoria Park
| 29,491
| 27 April 1968
|- bgcolor="#FFFFFF"
| 
| 13.10 (88)
| 
| 14.14 (98)
| Lake Oval
| 17,260
| 27 April 1968
|- bgcolor="#FFFFFF"
| 
| 15.17 (107)
| 
| 14.7 (91)
| Arden Street Oval
| 13,122
| 27 April 1968

Round 4

|- bgcolor="#CCCCFF"
| Home team
| Home team score
| Away team
| Away team score
| Venue
| Crowd
| Date
|- bgcolor="#FFFFFF"
| 
| 12.10 (82)
| 
| 12.4 (76)
| MCG
| 19,498
| 4 May 1968
|- bgcolor="#FFFFFF"
| 
| 13.19 (97)
| 
| 12.13 (85)
| Princes Park
| 11,378
| 4 May 1968
|- bgcolor="#FFFFFF"
| 
| 16.19 (115)
| 
| 10.15 (75)
| Windy Hill
| 19,000
| 4 May 1968
|- bgcolor="#FFFFFF"
| 
| 12.12 (84)
| 
| 7.18 (60)
| Moorabbin Oval
| 30,606
| 4 May 1968
|- bgcolor="#FFFFFF"
| 
| 6.10 (46)
| 
| 4.13 (37)
| Kardinia Park
| 19,144
| 4 May 1968
|- bgcolor="#FFFFFF"
| 
| 11.11 (77)
| 
| 15.10 (100)
| Glenferrie Oval
| 17,606
| 4 May 1968

Round 5

|- bgcolor="#CCCCFF"
| Home team
| Home team score
| Away team
| Away team score
| Venue
| Crowd
| Date
|- bgcolor="#FFFFFF"
| 
| 6.13 (49)
| 
| 9.7 (61)
| Arden Street Oval
| 14,409
| 11 May 1968
|- bgcolor="#FFFFFF"
| 
| 16.16 (112)
| 
| 11.15 (81)
| Windy Hill
| 18,500
| 11 May 1968
|- bgcolor="#FFFFFF"
| 
| 17.11 (113)
| 
| 11.16 (82)
| Victoria Park
| 20,688
| 11 May 1968
|- bgcolor="#FFFFFF"
| 
| 16.15 (111)
| 
| 5.9 (39)
| Princes Park
| 14,490
| 11 May 1968
|- bgcolor="#FFFFFF"
| 
| 8.10 (58)
| 
| 13.25 (103)
| Lake Oval
| 17,783
| 11 May 1968
|- bgcolor="#FFFFFF"
| 
| 9.9 (63)
| 
| 10.10 (70)
| MCG
| 31,862
| 11 May 1968

Round 6

|- bgcolor="#CCCCFF"
| Home team
| Home team score
| Away team
| Away team score
| Venue
| Crowd
| Date
|- bgcolor="#FFFFFF"
| 
| 13.7 (85)
| 
| 6.12 (48)
| Western Oval
| 10,441
| 18 May 1968
|- bgcolor="#FFFFFF"
| 
| 6.8 (44)
| 
| 19.6 (120)
| Princes Park
| 12,852
| 18 May 1968
|- bgcolor="#FFFFFF"
| 
| 13.14 (92)
| 
| 9.12 (66)
| Victoria Park
| 28,302
| 18 May 1968
|- bgcolor="#FFFFFF"
| 
| 14.17 (101)
| 
| 4.7 (31)
| MCG
| 24,317
| 18 May 1968
|- bgcolor="#FFFFFF"
| 
| 10.11 (71)
| 
| 12.10 (82)
| Glenferrie Oval
| 10,100
| 18 May 1968
|- bgcolor="#FFFFFF"
| 
| 10.11 (71)
| 
| 12.11 (83)
| Lake Oval
| 13,420
| 18 May 1968

Round 7

|- bgcolor="#CCCCFF"
| Home team
| Home team score
| Away team
| Away team score
| Venue
| Crowd
| Date
|- bgcolor="#FFFFFF"
| 
| 7.15 (57)
| 
| 8.13 (61)
| Arden Street Oval
| 7,730
| 25 May 1968
|- bgcolor="#FFFFFF"
| 
| 11.14 (80)
| 
| 10.18 (78)
| Windy Hill
| 22,980
| 25 May 1968
|- bgcolor="#FFFFFF"
| 
| 15.11 (101)
| 
| 9.13 (67)
| Princes Park
| 26,045
| 25 May 1968
|- bgcolor="#FFFFFF"
| 
| 11.14 (80)
| 
| 11.10 (76)
| MCG
| 17,263
| 25 May 1968
|- bgcolor="#FFFFFF"
| 
| 11.13 (79)
| 
| 4.11 (35)
| Moorabbin Oval
| 16,056
| 25 May 1968
|- bgcolor="#FFFFFF"
| 
| 11.21 (87)
| 
| 7.6 (48)
| Kardinia Park
| 11,474
| 25 May 1968

Round 8

|- bgcolor="#CCCCFF"
| Home team
| Home team score
| Away team
| Away team score
| Venue
| Crowd
| Date
|- bgcolor="#FFFFFF"
| 
| 9.8 (62)
| 
| 11.9 (75)
| Western Oval
| 14,755
| 8 June 1968
|- bgcolor="#FFFFFF"
| 
| 11.13 (79)
| 
| 13.7 (85)
| Victoria Park
| 24,375
| 8 June 1968
|- bgcolor="#FFFFFF"
| 
| 9.11 (65)
| 
| 13.11 (89)
| Arden Street Oval
| 13,209
| 8 June 1968
|- bgcolor="#FFFFFF"
| 
| 11.15 (81)
| 
| 11.14 (80)
| MCG
| 31,325
| 10 June 1968
|- bgcolor="#FFFFFF"
| 
| 16.17 (113)
| 
| 8.9 (57)
| Moorabbin Oval
| 43,231
| 10 June 1968
|- bgcolor="#FFFFFF"
| 
| 4.10 (34)
| 
| 13.15 (93)
| Princes Park
| 19,306
| 10 June 1968

Round 9

|- bgcolor="#CCCCFF"
| Home team
| Home team score
| Away team
| Away team score
| Venue
| Crowd
| Date
|- bgcolor="#FFFFFF"
| 
| 9.9 (63)
| 
| 17.17 (119)
| MCG
| 39,609
| 15 June 1968
|- bgcolor="#FFFFFF"
| 
| 15.9 (99)
| 
| 11.9 (75)
| Kardinia Park
| 29,404
| 15 June 1968
|- bgcolor="#FFFFFF"
| 
| 11.17 (83)
| 
| 5.11 (41)
| Windy Hill
| 14,000
| 15 June 1968
|- bgcolor="#FFFFFF"
| 
| 20.11 (131)
| 
| 10.15 (75)
| Princes Park
| 15,270
| 15 June 1968
|- bgcolor="#FFFFFF"
| 
| 21.14 (140)
| 
| 16.14 (110)
| Glenferrie Oval
| 11,039
| 15 June 1968
|- bgcolor="#FFFFFF"
| 
| 19.10 (124)
| 
| 15.9 (99)
| Lake Oval
| 17,193
| 15 June 1968

Round 10

|- bgcolor="#CCCCFF"
| Home team
| Home team score
| Away team
| Away team score
| Venue
| Crowd
| Date
|- bgcolor="#FFFFFF"
| 
| 13.15 (93)
| 
| 8.15 (63)
| Kardinia Park
| 17,794
| 22 June 1968
|- bgcolor="#FFFFFF"
| 
| 12.12 (84)
| 
| 15.15 (105)
| Princes Park
| 11,204
| 22 June 1968
|- bgcolor="#FFFFFF"
| 
| 8.14 (62)
| 
| 15.16 (106)
| Arden Street Oval
| 7,884
| 22 June 1968
|- bgcolor="#FFFFFF"
| 
| 9.14 (68)
| 
| 15.6 (96)
| MCG
| 32,932
| 22 June 1968
|- bgcolor="#FFFFFF"
| 
| 5.7 (37)
| 
| 9.11 (65)
| Western Oval
| 13,120
| 22 June 1968
|- bgcolor="#FFFFFF"
| 
| 3.10 (28)
| 
| 8.8 (56)
| Moorabbin Oval
| 28,885
| 22 June 1968

Round 11

|- bgcolor="#CCCCFF"
| Home team
| Home team score
| Away team
| Away team score
| Venue
| Crowd
| Date
|- bgcolor="#FFFFFF"
| 
| 15.11 (101)
| 
| 17.9 (111)
| Glenferrie Oval
| 19,279
| 29 June 1968
|- bgcolor="#FFFFFF"
| 
| 14.20 (104)
| 
| 12.9 (81)
| Windy Hill
| 24,450
| 29 June 1968
|- bgcolor="#FFFFFF"
| 
| 13.16 (94)
| 
| 4.8 (32)
| Victoria Park
| 14,814
| 29 June 1968
|- bgcolor="#FFFFFF"
| 
| 11.19 (85)
| 
| 6.7 (43)
| Princes Park
| 15,234
| 29 June 1968
|- bgcolor="#FFFFFF"
| 
| 17.20 (122)
| 
| 16.8 (104)
| MCG
| 17,844
| 29 June 1968
|- bgcolor="#FFFFFF"
| 
| 17.15 (117)
| 
| 13.12 (90)
| Lake Oval
| 11,241
| 29 June 1968

Round 12

|- bgcolor="#CCCCFF"
| Home team
| Home team score
| Away team
| Away team score
| Venue
| Crowd
| Date
|- bgcolor="#FFFFFF"
| 
| 15.19 (109)
| 
| 6.9 (45)
| Moorabbin Oval
| 19,059
| 6 July 1968
|- bgcolor="#FFFFFF"
| 
| 11.14 (80)
| 
| 14.16 (100)
| Princes Park
| 8,530
| 6 July 1968
|- bgcolor="#FFFFFF"
| 
| 8.9 (57)
| 
| 9.18 (72)
| Arden Street Oval
| 7,844
| 6 July 1968
|- bgcolor="#FFFFFF"
| 
| 11.17 (83)
| 
| 17.10 (112)
| Glenferrie Oval
| 12,480
| 6 July 1968
|- bgcolor="#FFFFFF"
| 
| 17.12 (114)
| 
| 17.15 (117)
| MCG
| 43,165
| 6 July 1968
|- bgcolor="#FFFFFF"
| 
| 8.7 (55)
| 
| 9.9 (63)
| Kardinia Park
| 25,007
| 6 July 1968

Round 13

|- bgcolor="#CCCCFF"
| Home team
| Home team score
| Away team
| Away team score
| Venue
| Crowd
| Date
|- bgcolor="#FFFFFF"
| 
| 10.11 (71)
| 
| 10.16 (76)
| MCG
| 30,581
| 13 July 1968
|- bgcolor="#FFFFFF"
| 
| 18.18 (126)
| 
| 5.13 (43)
| Western Oval
| 13,092
| 13 July 1968
|- bgcolor="#FFFFFF"
| 
| 16.19 (115)
| 
| 9.9 (63)
| Windy Hill
| 11,690
| 13 July 1968
|- bgcolor="#FFFFFF"
| 
| 18.14 (122)
| 
| 18.7 (115)
| Victoria Park
| 16,357
| 13 July 1968
|- bgcolor="#FFFFFF"
| 
| 11.14 (80)
| 
| 10.14 (74)
| Princes Park
| 24,245
| 13 July 1968
|- bgcolor="#FFFFFF"
| 
| 12.10 (82)
| 
| 15.11 (101)
| Lake Oval
| 11,191
| 13 July 1968

Round 14

|- bgcolor="#CCCCFF"
| Home team
| Home team score
| Away team
| Away team score
| Venue
| Crowd
| Date
|- bgcolor="#FFFFFF"
| 
| 10.10 (70)
| 
| 12.8 (80)
| MCG
| 18,976
| 20 July 1968
|- bgcolor="#FFFFFF"
| 
| 13.11 (89)
| 
| 9.16 (70)
| Kardinia Park
| 23,932
| 20 July 1968
|- bgcolor="#FFFFFF"
| 
| 13.17 (95)
| 
| 9.14 (68)
| Princes Park
| 7,563
| 20 July 1968
|- bgcolor="#FFFFFF"
| 
| 24.8 (152)
| 
| 10.10 (70)
| Glenferrie Oval
| 13,810
| 20 July 1968
|- bgcolor="#FFFFFF"
| 
| 11.10 (76)
| 
| 12.13 (85)
| Moorabbin Oval
| 28,246
| 20 July 1968
|- bgcolor="#FFFFFF"
| 
| 7.13 (55)
| 
| 6.13 (49)
| Windy Hill
| 32,000
| 20 July 1968

Round 15

|- bgcolor="#CCCCFF"
| Home team
| Home team score
| Away team
| Away team score
| Venue
| Crowd
| Date
|- bgcolor="#FFFFFF"
| 
| 13.16 (94)
| 
| 9.10 (64)
| MCG
| 42,740
| 27 July 1968
|- bgcolor="#FFFFFF"
| 
| 4.12 (36)
| 
| 7.12 (54)
| Victoria Park
| 25,849
| 27 July 1968
|- bgcolor="#FFFFFF"
| 
| 9.14 (68)
| 
| 11.15 (81)
| Princes Park
| 18,470
| 27 July 1968
|- bgcolor="#FFFFFF"
| 
| 5.8 (38)
| 
| 6.4 (40)
| Arden Street Oval
| 5,826
| 27 July 1968
|- bgcolor="#FFFFFF"
| 
| 9.12 (66)
| 
| 10.11 (71)
| Western Oval
| 10,148
| 27 July 1968
|- bgcolor="#FFFFFF"
| 
| 7.12 (54)
| 
| 14.13 (97)
| Lake Oval
| 14,690
| 27 July 1968

Round 16

|- bgcolor="#CCCCFF"
| Home team
| Home team score
| Away team
| Away team score
| Venue
| Crowd
| Date
|- bgcolor="#FFFFFF"
| 
| 15.21 (111)
| 
| 10.11 (71)
| MCG
| 22,404
| 3 August 1968
|- bgcolor="#FFFFFF"
| 
| 11.9 (75)
| 
| 10.8 (68)
| Kardinia Park
| 14,240
| 3 August 1968
|- bgcolor="#FFFFFF"
| 
| 8.13 (61)
| 
| 6.3 (39)
| Moorabbin Oval
| 13,355
| 3 August 1968
|- bgcolor="#FFFFFF"
| 
| 13.15 (93)
| 
| 13.16 (94)
| Princes Park
| 12,080
| 3 August 1968
|- bgcolor="#FFFFFF"
| 
| 15.11 (101)
| 
| 10.16 (76)
| Glenferrie Oval
| 26,928
| 3 August 1968
|- bgcolor="#FFFFFF"
| 
| 16.6 (102)
| 
| 10.10 (70)
| Western Oval
| 15,184
| 3 August 1968

Round 17

|- bgcolor="#CCCCFF"
| Home team
| Home team score
| Away team
| Away team score
| Venue
| Crowd
| Date
|- bgcolor="#FFFFFF"
| 
| 7.9 (51)
| 
| 11.19 (85)
| Arden Street Oval
| 9,374
| 10 August 1968
|- bgcolor="#FFFFFF"
| 
| 10.7 (67)
| 
| 7.9 (51)
| Kardinia Park
| 20,822
| 10 August 1968
|- bgcolor="#FFFFFF"
| 
| 18.14 (122)
| 
| 11.14 (80)
| Princes Park
| 15,620
| 10 August 1968
|- bgcolor="#FFFFFF"
| 
| 10.14 (74)
| 
| 9.11 (65)
| MCG
| 18,733
| 10 August 1968
|- bgcolor="#FFFFFF"
| 
| 12.19 (91)
| 
| 6.5 (41)
| Moorabbin Oval
| 15,643
| 10 August 1968
|- bgcolor="#FFFFFF"
| 
| 20.18 (138)
| 
| 7.11 (53)
| Windy Hill
| 21,300
| 10 August 1968

Round 18

|- bgcolor="#CCCCFF"
| Home team
| Home team score
| Away team
| Away team score
| Venue
| Crowd
| Date
|- bgcolor="#FFFFFF"
| 
| 14.13 (97)
| 
| 8.11 (59)
| Glenferrie Oval
| 14,359
| 17 August 1968
|- bgcolor="#FFFFFF"
| 
| 6.8 (44)
| 
| 16.13 (109)
| Western Oval
| 15,211
| 17 August 1968
|- bgcolor="#FFFFFF"
| 
| 10.12 (72)
| 
| 14.10 (94)
| Princes Park
| 9,782
| 17 August 1968
|- bgcolor="#FFFFFF"
| 
| 9.14 (68)
| 
| 11.13 (79)
| Lake Oval
| 7,412
| 17 August 1968
|- bgcolor="#FFFFFF"
| 
| 10.14 (74)
| 
| 7.12 (54)
| MCG
| 68,529
| 17 August 1968
|- bgcolor="#FFFFFF"
| 
| 10.10 (70)
| 
| 16.11 (107)
| Victoria Park
| 24,496
| 17 August 1968

Round 19

|- bgcolor="#CCCCFF"
| Home team
| Home team score
| Away team
| Away team score
| Venue
| Crowd
| Date
|- bgcolor="#FFFFFF"
| 
| 11.13 (79)
| 
| 11.22 (88)
| Glenferrie Oval
| 21,772
| 24 August 1968
|- bgcolor="#FFFFFF"
| 
| 14.13 (97)
| 
| 13.9 (87)
| Kardinia Park
| 13,872
| 24 August 1968
|- bgcolor="#FFFFFF"
| 
| 10.6 (66)
| 
| 9.12 (66)
| Windy Hill
| 24,700
| 24 August 1968
|- bgcolor="#FFFFFF"
| 
| 21.17 (143)
| 
| 12.19 (91)
| Princes Park
| 16,123
| 24 August 1968
|- bgcolor="#FFFFFF"
| 
| 11.12 (78)
| 
| 11.16 (82)
| Lake Oval
| 8,012
| 24 August 1968
|- bgcolor="#FFFFFF"
| 
| 12.14 (86)
| 
| 12.15 (87)
| MCG
| 29,967
| 24 August 1968

Round 20

|- bgcolor="#CCCCFF"
| Home team
| Home team score
| Away team
| Away team score
| Venue
| Crowd
| Date
|- bgcolor="#FFFFFF"
| 
| 17.14 (116)
| 
| 18.18 (126)
| Princes Park
| 11,440
| 31 August 1968
|- bgcolor="#FFFFFF"
| 
| 23.19 (157)
| 
| 14.14 (98)
| Victoria Park
| 11,648
| 31 August 1968
|- bgcolor="#FFFFFF"
| 
| 18.21 (129)
| 
| 12.8 (80)
| MCG
| 34,546
| 31 August 1968
|- bgcolor="#FFFFFF"
| 
| 16.14 (110)
| 
| 8.11 (59)
| Moorabbin Oval
| 34,073
| 31 August 1968
|- bgcolor="#FFFFFF"
| 
| 12.13 (85)
| 
| 15.22 (112)
| Western Oval
| 19,196
| 31 August 1968
|- bgcolor="#FFFFFF"
| 
| 11.13 (79)
| 
| 15.10 (100)
| Arden Street Oval
| 16,189
| 31 August 1968

Ladder

Consolation Night Series Competition
The consolation night series were held under the floodlights at Lake Oval, South Melbourne, for the teams (5th to 12th on ladder) out of the finals at the end of the home and away rounds.

Final: Hawthorn 16.15 (111) defeated North Melbourne 6.14 (50).

Premiership Finals

First Semi-Final

Second Semi-Final

Preliminary Final

Grand final

Awards
 The 1968 VFL Premiership team was Carlton.
 The VFL's leading goalkicker was Peter Hudson of Hawthorn who kicked 125 goals.
 The winner of the 1968 Brownlow Medal was Bob Skilton of South Melbourne with 24 votes.
 North Melbourne took the "wooden spoon" in 1968.
Essendon 15.7 (97) defeated  13.14 (92) in the Grand Final, held as a curtain-raiser to the seniors Grand Final at the Melbourne Cricket Ground on 28 September.

Notable events
 The season's home-and-away draw was extended from 18 to 20 rounds. This now meant that each team met nine of the other eleven teams twice in a season.
 In Round 3, the Anzac Day match between Carlton and Essendon at Princes Park was greatly affected by an unusually strong wind that blew across the ground from wing to wing, making kicking and marking entirely unpredictable as balls would almost turn at right angles in the air as they moved down the ground towards the outer (eastern) end and lost the protection of the stands (or, whilst in the stand-protected western end, the ball went above the protection of the stands). In an otherwise close, hard-fought match with not many scoring opportunities available, Carlton were least able to cope with the windy conditions, kicking 1.11 (17) to Essendon's 7.8 (50). 
 In Round 7, Essendon played Richmond at Windy Hill in a rain-sodden game that finished in such dark conditions that players could not see across the ground. In the last quarter, a goal was awarded to Geoff Gosper, although several Richmond players protested that the ball had hit the post. Essendon won the match by two points, 11.14 (80) to Richmond's 10.18 (78).
After the goal-umpires checked their scorecards, it was confirmed that the scoreboard was reading incorrectly, and that Richmond had, in fact, won by a point: 11.15 (81) to 11.14 (80). 
 Peter Hudson became the first player to kick 100 goals in a season since John Coleman in 1952.
 In Round 17 and Round 18 respectively, Ron Barassi and Brian Dixon played their 250th VFL games. At the time, only thirteen other players had reached the milestone.
The lost points relegated Geelong from fourth to last place on the ladder.
 For the first and, as of 2022, only time in VFL history, the premiership team kicked fewer goals than the runners-up in the Grand Final.

References

 Hogan, P., The Tigers of Old, The Richmond Football Club, (Richmond), 1996. 
 Maplestone, M., Flying Higher: History of the Essendon Football Club 1872–1996, Essendon Football Club, (Melbourne), 1996. 
 Rogers, S. & Brown, A., Every Game Ever Played: VFL/AFL Results 1897–1997 (Sixth Edition), Viking Books, (Ringwood), 1998. 
 Ross, J. (ed), 100 Years of Australian Football 1897–1996: The Complete Story of the AFL, All the Big Stories, All the Great Pictures, All the Champions, Every AFL Season Reported, Viking, (Ringwood), 1996.

External links
 1968 Season – AFL Tables

Australian Football League seasons
VFL season